Pasquale Lattuneddu (born 12 August 1956 in Tempio Pausania, Sardinia) is an Italian businessman and former Chief of Operations of the Formula One Group (FOM). He worked in Formula One until Liberty Media's acquisition of FOM in January 2017.

Considered the Bernie Ecclestone's right-hand man, Lattuneddu was pivotal in the day-to-day operations of the paddock and the timings and fluency of procedures on race days.

In 2015, he was named as the 20th most influential person in Formula One.

References 

People from Sardinia
Sportspeople from Sardinia
Living people
1956 births